Dora Maria Sigerson Shorter (16 August 1866 – 6 January 1918) was an Irish poet and sculptor, who after her marriage in 1895 wrote under the name Dora Sigerson Shorter.

Life
She was born in Dublin, Ireland, the daughter of George Sigerson, a surgeon and writer, and Hester Varian, also a writer. She was the oldest of 4 children. The family home at 3 Clare Street was a gathering-place for artists and writers where Dora met important figures of the emerging Irish literary revival. She attended the Dublin School of Art, where W.B. Yeats was a fellow-pupil. She was a major figure of the Irish Literary Revival, publishing many collections of poetry from 1893. Her sister Hester Sigerson Piatt was also a writer. Her friends included Katharine Tynan, Rose Kavanagh and Alice Furlong, writers and poets.

In 1895 she married Clement King Shorter, an English journalist and literary critic. They lived together in London, until her death at age 51 from undisclosed causes. Her friend Katharine Tynan wrote in a biographical sketch that she supposedly ‘died of a broken heart’ after the 1916 executions.

Selected publications
 The Fairy Changeling and Other Poems London & New York: John Lane 1897.
 The Story and Song of Black Roderick London: Alexander Moring 1906.
 The Collected Poems of Dora Sigerson Shorter; with an introduction by George Meredith. London: Hodder & Stoughton, 1907.
 New Poems. Dublin & London: Maunsel, 1912 (3rd ed., 1921).
 Madge Linsey, and other poems. Dublin & London: Maunsel, 1913.

References

External links

 
 Works at Open Library
 
 
 Archival Material at 

1866 births
1918 deaths
People from County Dublin
Irish women poets
Irish women sculptors
20th-century Irish sculptors
19th-century Irish sculptors
19th-century Irish women artists
20th-century Irish women artists